The Virgins is the first full-length album by The Virgins. It was released June 3, 2008. Many songs on the album were originally from their EP, The Virgins '07. "Private Affair" was chosen as the first single for the album. The song "Hey Hey Girl" was used in the trailer for the movie Miss March, while the song "Rich Girls" was used in the movie 17 Again, in the trailer for She's Out of My League, an episode of Castle (Ghosts) and in a Rugby Ralph Lauren fall 2010 promotional lifestyle film. The songs "One Week of Danger", "Rich Girls", "Fernando Pando", "Radio Christiane", and "Love is Colder Than Death" were also used in the TV show Gossip Girl in the episode "Seventeen Candles". The song "Hey Hey Girl" also appears in The Vampire Diaries in season one episode eighteen.

Track listing

Charts
The album was listed for 14 weeks on the France Albums Top 150. It entered the chart on position 102 on week 40/2008, and its last appearance was on week 14/2009. It peaked on number 71, where it stayed for 1 week.

References

2008 debut albums
The Virgins albums
Albums produced by S*A*M and Sluggo
Atlantic Records albums